This is a list of museums in the state of Baden-Württemberg, Germany. Also included are non-profit art galleries and university art galleries.

References

 State Office for Museum Services Baden-Württemberg 
 Museums & Exhibitions - Tourismus Marketing GmbH Baden-Württemberg
 Stuttgart Region: Museums and galleries

Museums
Baden-Wurttemberg